Abrotanella linearis is a member of the daisy family and is found on Stewart Island and South Island of New Zealand.

References

linearis
Flora of New Zealand